The 1942 South Carolina United States Senate election was held on November 3, 1942 to select the U.S. Senator from the state of South Carolina.  Incumbent Democratic Senator Burnet R. Maybank defeated Eugene S. Blease in the Democratic primary and was unopposed in the general election to win a six-year term.

Background

In 1937, Senator James F. Byrnes began a six-year term ending in 1943, but President Franklin D. Roosevelt appointed him to the Supreme Court in 1940. To fill the vacancy until a successor could be duly elected, Governor of South Carolina Burnet R. Maybank appointed Judge Alva Lumpkin, but Lumpkin died on August 1, 1941. Maybank then appointed Roger C. Peace to succeed Lumpkin. Peace did not run in the special election to complete the term.

In the special election to complete Byrnes's unexpired term on November, Governor Maybank defeated former Governor Olin D. Johnston.

Democratic primary

Candidates
Burnet R. Maybank, incumbent Senator since 1941
Eugene Satterwhite Blease, former Chief Justice of the South Carolina Supreme Court and half-brother of former Governor and Senator Cole Blease

Campaign
Maybank campaigned in support of the Roosevelt administration and defeated Blease in the primary election on August 25.

Results

General election
There was no opposition to the Democratic candidate in the general election so Maybank was elected to a six-year term in the Senate.

|-
| 
| colspan=5 |Democratic hold
|-

See also
List of United States senators from South Carolina
1942 United States Senate elections
1942 United States House of Representatives elections in South Carolina
1942 South Carolina gubernatorial election

Notes

References

"Supplemental Report of the Secretary of State to the General Assembly of South Carolina." Reports and Resolutions of South Carolina to the General Assembly of the State of South Carolina. Volume I. Columbia, SC: 1943, p. 5.

1942 South Carolina elections
1942
South Carolina
1942 United States